Passo do Verde ("green pitch") is a bairro in the District of Passo do Verde in the municipality of Santa Maria, in the Brazilian state of Rio Grande do Sul. It is situated in the south of Santa Maria.

Villages 
The bairro contains the following villages: Passo do Verde, Passo Velho do Arenal, Arenal, Colônia Pena, Mato Alto, Vila Passo do Verde.

References 

Bairros of Santa Maria, Rio Grande do Sul